Prince Fyodor Yuryevich Romodanovsky (ca. 1640 – 1717) was one of Peter the Great's foremost assistants in the task of modernizing Russia.

An influential boyar from the Romodanovsky family, Prince Fyodor was given the post of the head of the Preobrazhensky prikaz in 1686, when its functions involved the administration of the Preobrazhensky and Semyonovsky units. His integrity and resolution won him the admiration of young Tsar Peter, who made him "Generalissimo" of his toy army.

During Peter's frequent absences from the capital between 1695 and 1699 he entrusted Romodanovsky with governing the country. When the Streltsy Uprising of 1698 erupted in Peter's absence, Romodanovsky ruthlessly suppressed it. For his vital services to the crown Peter jocundly styled Romodanovsky "His Caesarean Majesty" (кесарское величество) and "Prince Caesar" (князь-кесарь). Romodanovsky also had the right to keep his own court at Ropsha (south of Peterhof) and to promote officers. The Tsar addressed him in German as "Min Herr Koenig" ("My Lord King") and signed his own letters "Your Majesty's humblest servant Piter".

Until his death, on 17 September 1717, Romodanovsky remained in charge of the secret police, the Siberian prikaz, and the Apothecary; basically he operated as the second-most powerful man (and the most feared man) in Russia until his death. Long after Romodanovsky's death, Klyuchevsky (1841-1911) described him as a "a monstrum by appearance, a vicious tyrant by character".

Most of Peter the Great's biographies tend to overlook the role of Romodanovsky, who served as an unconditional supporter of Peter and as his most-feared and very effective official. While other Peter's adherents built and fought, Romodanovsky ensured, with an iron hand, that there was no opposition.

Fyodor Romodanovsky's only son,  ( 1677–1730) succeeded him in office at the Preobrazhensky prikaz from 1717 to 1729.

See also
 Preobrazhensky Regiment

Russian police chiefs
Generalissimos
1640 births
Secret service personnel of the Russian Empire
1717 deaths
17th-century Russian people
18th-century people from the Russian Empire
Fyodor